For the People is a live album by Jerome Cooper. It was recorded in May 1979 at The Kitchen in New York City, and was released on LP by Hat Hut Records in 1980. On the album, Cooper, who plays a variety of instruments, including drums, chirimia, African balaphone, and whistle, is joined by Oliver Lake, who performs on alto saxophone, flute, bells, and vocals.

Reception

The editors of AllMusic awarded the album 3 stars. A writer for Modern Drummer called the music "compelling duets that never fail to swing." Mats Gustafsson and Björn Thorstensson wrote: "Killer duo album with Cooper and the always-as-amazing Oliver Lake... True interaction with a great sound... Very recommendable music."

Track listing
All compositions by Jerome Cooper.

Side A
 "Movement" – 13:50
 "Movement" – 5:40

Side B
 "Movement" – 5:35
 "Movement" – 4:45
 "Movement" – 5:00
 "Movement" – 5:40

 Recorded on May 12, 1979, at The Kitchen in New York City.

Personnel 
 Jerome Cooper – drums, chirimia, balafon, whistle
 Oliver Lake – alto saxophone, flute, bells, voice

References

Jerome Cooper live albums
1980 live albums
Oliver Lake live albums